Sathon district is one of 50 districts in Bangkok, Thailand.

Sathon may also refer to:
Sathon Road, major road in Bangkok
Sathorn Pier, pier along the Chao Phraya River near Taksin Bridge in Bangkok
Sathon (wasp), genus of wasps

See also